Melvin George may refer to:
 Melvin Clark George, U.S. Representative from Oregon
 Melvin Boban George, Liberian footballer
 Mel George, American educator